Li Gengtao (1912–1974) was a People's Republic of China politician. He was born in Fuping County, Hebei. He was the 4th mayor of Tianjin. He was a delegate to the 2nd National People's Congress and a vice-governor of Hebei.

References

1912 births
1974 deaths
People's Republic of China politicians from Hebei
Chinese Communist Party politicians from Hebei
Vice-governors of Hebei
Li
Mayors of Tianjin
Politicians from Baoding